Noktundo is a former island (currently a peninsula) in the delta of the Tumen River on the border between Primorsky Krai, Russia and North Korea.

In the 15th century, Noktundo belonged to the Jurchen. In 1587 there was a battle fought on this island between the local Jurchen and the invading army from Yi Sun-sin, a general of Korea.

At the time of the shallowing of the northern branch of the Tumen, the course of the river changed from time to time. As a result, the island of Noktundo was sometimes joined with the mainland of Primorsky Krai. Regardless, the island remained under Korean jurisdiction.

The island was under Korean control until 1860 Convention of Peking, when the Russian Empire took over the island. When the Joseon government found this out in the 1880s, this became a matter of protest to the Koreans, who claimed that the Russians had no authority to do so, and protested it to the Qing. In 1990, Soviet Union and North Korea signed a border treaty which made the border run through the center of the river leaving the territory of the former island on the Russian side. South Korea refused to acknowledge the treaty and demanded that Russia return the territory to Korea.

References

Landforms of North Korea
Former islands
Former islands of Russia
North Korea–Russia border
Peninsulas of Asia
Korea–Soviet Union relations
Geography of Primorsky Krai